Barningham is a village and civil parish in the West Suffolk district of Suffolk, England, about twelve miles north-east of Bury St Edmunds. According to Eilert Ekwall, the meaning of the village name is the homestead of Beorn's people. The Domesday Book records the population of Barningham in 1086 to be  36. It has a primary school, a  pub called the Royal George, a shop with a post office, a church, a hairdresser's, a village hall and a flower shop.

The pharmaceutical company Fisons, founded by James Fison and Lee Charters in the late 18th century, began as a flour mill and bakery in the village. The building has since been developed into terraced homes.

External links
 
 

Villages in Suffolk
Civil parishes in Suffolk
Borough of St Edmundsbury